Kathy Parashis is an Australian snooker player.  The winner of ten women's Australian Open titles, she also reached the quarter finals at the 2006 IBSF World Championships in Amman, Jordan, where she was eliminated by Anuja Thakur 4–1. She was runner-up at the 2009 IBSF Women's Championship.

References

Living people
1960 births
Australian snooker players
Female snooker players